Orange Island was a rock band based out of the town Clinton, Massachusetts. Orange Island formed in 1996 when cousins Charles Young and Brendan Dickhaut started writing music together and had David Chouinard playing bass guitar. After writing songs together they asked their friend David Gorman to sing for the group. Orange Island wrote and recorded several demos before being signed to the Boston-based record label Iodine Recordings in 2000. The Shape of Calling was Orange Island's debut album and shortly after its release the band started touring the US with many well known bands including Brand New, The Movielife, Breaking Pangaea, Kill Verona and others. in 2002 Orange Island released their follow-up full length titled Everything You Thought You Knew. This album dealt with themes related to struggling with alcoholism and losing a close friend.

Orange Island went through several line up changes after the release of their second album (losing their bass player David Chouinard prior to its release) who left the band to join the military after 9/11. Several people filled in on bass until they took on Joseph Dufresne, a good friend who formerly played in the Boston band The Chase Scene. Joseph started playing second guitar, David Gorman started to only sing, and Colin Spencer (also of The Chase Scene) took over on bass.

Orange Island left Iodine Recordings and signed to Triple Crown Records and released a self titled CD that was very well received by reviewers and the indie scene. Orange Island toured for the new album with the punk band Tsunami Bomb. 

In 2004 Orange Island released their final album titled The Morning After, which was released on the Oregon-based record label Rise Records. Orange Island disbanded shortly after this last release.

Final line-up 

 Brendan Dickhaut - Guitar
 Joseph Gonzalez-Dufresne - Guitar
 David Gorman - Vocals
 Colin Spencer - Bass
 Charles Young - Drums

Other members 

 David Chouinard - Bass
 Jason Brodrick - Bass
 Brian Price - Bass

Discography 

 The Shape of Calling EP (2001)
 Everything You Thought You Knew (2002)
 Orange Island (2003)
 The Morning After EP (2004)
 Split w/ Garrison EP (2004)

Compilation appearances 

 Still Green Movie Soundtrack (2007) - "Pyretic Eyes (The Same Soap Opera)"
 Beer: The Movie Movie Soundtrack (2003) - "Stand Up, State Your Name"
 Gravity Rides Everything Iodine Sampler (2003) - "Finding the Casual"

External links 
Orange Island MySpace page
 Orange Island Purevolume Page

Rise Records artists
Triple Crown Records artists